Statocytes are gravity-sensing (gravitropic) cells in higher plants. They contain amyloplasts-statoliths – starch-filled amyloplastic organelles – which sediment at the lowest part of the cells. Statocytes are present in the elongating region of coleoptiles, shoots and inflorescence stems. In roots, the root cap is the only place where sedimentation is observed, and only the central columella cells of the root cap serve as gravity-sensing statocytes. They can initiate differential growth patterns, bending the root towards the vertical axis.

References

See also 
 Prolonged sine

Plant cells